One King's Way is the second part of the trilogy by Harry Harrison and John Holm (Tom Shippey) that began with The Hammer and the Cross. The book was published in 1994.

Plot summary

Shef is now co-king of a realm in southern Britain. After getting separated from his comrades in a sea battle with the Ragnarssons, he begins an epic journey through Scandinavia.  Also travelling through Scandinavia is Bruno, a Christian knight in search of the Holy Lance, hoped to restore the empire of Charlemagne. The book was followed by the final part of the trilogy, King and Emperor.

References

1994 British novels
1994 American novels
British fantasy novels
American fantasy novels
Fictional Vikings
American alternate history novels
Irish alternative history novels
Novels by Harry Harrison
Norse mythology in popular culture
Novels set in the Viking Age
British alternative history novels
The Hammer and the Cross series
Novels set in Europe
Collaborative novels
Legend Books books